Oregon Route 402 (OR 402) is an Oregon state highway running from Kimberly to Long Creek. OR 402 is known as the Kimberly-Long Creek Highway No. 402 (see Oregon highways and routes).

OR 402 was established in 2002 as part of Oregon's project to assign route numbers to highways that previously were not assigned.

Route description 

OR 402 begins at an intersection with OR 19 at Kimberly and heads east through Monument and Hamilton to Long Creek, where it ends at an intersection with US 395.

History 

OR 402 was assigned to the Kimberly-Long Creek Highway in 2002.

Major intersections

References 
 Oregon Department of Transportation, Descriptions of US and Oregon Routes, https://web.archive.org/web/20051102084300/http://www.oregon.gov/ODOT/HWY/TRAFFIC/TEOS_Publications/PDF/Descriptions_of_US_and_Oregon_Routes.pdf, page 24.
 Oregon Department of Transportation, Kimberly-Long Creek Highway No. 402, ftp://ftp.odot.state.or.us/tdb/trandata/maps/slchart_pdfs_1980_to_2002/Hwy402_2001.pdf

402
Transportation in Grant County, Oregon